Golden Gloves is the name given to annual competitions for amateur boxing in the United States.

Golden Glove or Golden Gloves may also refer to:

Film 
Golden Gloves (1940 film), American crime film directed by Edward Dmytryk
Golden Gloves (1961 film), Canadian documentary directed by Gilles Groulx

Awards

Association football 
 Golden Glove Award, FIFA competition award for best goalkeeper of tournament
 FIFA World Cup Golden Glove, FIFA World Cup award for best goalkeeper of tournament
 FIFA U-20 World Cup Golden Glove, FIFA U-20 World Cup award for best goalkeeper of tournament
 FIFA U-17 World Cup Golden Glove, FIFA U-20 World Cup award for best goalkeeper of tournament
 FIFA Women's World Cup Golden Glove, FIFA Women's World Cup award for best goalkeeper of tournament
 FIFA U-20 Women's World Cup Golden Glove, FIFA U-20 Women's World Cup award for best goalkeeper of tournament
 FIFA U-17 Women's World Cup Golden Glove, FIFA U-17 Women's World Cup award for best goalkeeper of tournament
 FIFA Club World Cup Golden Glove, FIFA Club World Cup award for best goalkeeper of tournament
 FIFA Confederations Cup Golden Glove, FIFA Confederations Cup award for best goalkeeper of tournament
 Premier League Golden Glove, an award for goalkeepers in the Premier League
 EFL Golden Glove, an award for goalkeepers in the English Football League

Baseball
 Mitsui Golden Glove Award, an award given to Nippon Professional Baseball players for outstanding defensive performance
 KBO League Golden Glove Award, award given to Korea Baseball Organization players for outstanding performance
 Gold Glove, award given to Major League Baseball players for outstanding defensive performance

See also